Goats is a popular webcomic written and illustrated by Jonathan Rosenberg. The webcomic started April 1, 1997. On April 3, 2006, after nine years drawing the strip, Rosenberg became a full-time cartoonist making his living drawing Goats. In 2010, because of work on Scenes from a Multiverse, Goats was put on hiatus. In 2012 Rosenberg raised more than $55,000 via Kickstarter to print Goats Book IV, relaunch the website and finish the story with Goats Book V. On August 19, 2014, 71 comics and all e-books were republished, while Kickstarter backers have yet to receive any merchandise.

Goats follows a (loose) plot surrounding the adventures of Rosenberg's cartoon alter ego, along with his friend/drinking buddy Phillip, and many characters including animals, celebrities, aliens and villains. Most of the strips are separated into story arcs, which have very different, though still coherent, plots. Except for the time that the world was destroyed, all of the strips fit into one continuous timeline.

The strip originally took place entirely in Manhattan, New York, and mostly within either Jon and Phillip's apartment or their favorite bar (the Peculier Pub, mirroring a genuine Manhattan pub). After several years, the strip has expanded significantly in plot expansion, character development and scene location.

Diversification began after what Rosenberg has referred to as "the soft reset" of the Goats multiverse when the Earth was destroyed.

Goats and Rosenberg are part of the Dumbrella collective. Goats was hosted by Phillip Karlsson's Dumbrella Hosting service.

Locations

Manhattan 3

Manhattan 3 is very similar to our universe in many regards (save for the existence of Satanic chickens, extraterrestrials and talking animals). The Earth was destroyed once, but no-one batted an eyelid. It is unclear as to whether that happened in Manhattan 3 or a very similar and much less complicated universe. Currently, due to the disappearance of Gus and Steve (the editor monkeys for Manhattan 3), the level has gone stagnant, causing the inhabitants to lapse into a sleepy state indistinguishable from death.

The Peculier Pub

The inspiration for the Peculier Pub is a pub with the same name that is located in Manhattan on Bleecker St. between LaGuardia Pl. and Thompson St. It is a museum of the brewing arts that simultaneously explains the evolution of the aluminum can and serves host to numerous students during busy weekend hours. The Peculier Pub of Manhattan 3 has been host to zombie invasions, alien sexual maturing, amorous goats, fish who live in beer, plane crashes, philosophical drunken debates and numerous other events.

New Jersey
New Jersey of the Goats multiverse is usually an ancillary location only seen in b-stories and recollection. It is generally south of Manhattan 3 but reference to Jersey 17 have shown that there are alternate New Jerseys that may or may not have any similarities to what we know.

Many characters have links to New Jersey in Goats. Diablo's mother was impregnated by the demonic soul of Ray Cohn in 1986 outside of Plainsboro. According to one of Diablo's Twix sagas, he later married Shazam Twix and they settled in a cottage in New Jersey and had five children. It also stands as the home of Stan, Diablo's poker partner, the Demon Fire of Xibalba and the location of the cave-home of Shazam Twix as he is looking for love while in a sanitarium. The initial target in Gregor Mendel's world takeover plan, New Jersey is often the butt of jokes for its questionable quality of life and has been even been equated to Brussels, the "New Jersey of Europe."

Allegedly, the New Jersey Turnpike connects the lower consulting levels of Xibalba to Manhattan 3's New Jersey without the need for teleportation or knacking.

Later plans for New Jersey have been touched on during Toothgnip's psychic ramblings where he states that in 2032, the ruins of New Jersey are ruled over by Jerrell.

Doodletown
Though an actual tourist location in New York, in the mind of Diablo, the site is an "Auschwitz for chickens" and home to anti-chickeners. It is also the site of the Chicken-Bear Massacre of 1869.

Pub Stub

Levels of existence exist along dimensional axis in the Goats multiverse. Along the axis in each dimension of existence is a pub that acts as the hub of the dimension.   At least one dimension is somewhat different; this dimension is one that "died in the womb" and whose only locale is the pub on the axis.

The only permanent resident in this "pub stub" is Alfred, a self-proclaimed "bartender to God" who has remained in the Pub after having been inexplicably transported there 19,000 subjective years (some twenty years in Earth Dimension time; time within the pub stub is not synced with other levels) from his homeland in Switzerland.

No objects within the pub have any color and visitors become grey if in the Pub Stub for a suitable amount of time.

Topeka Prime
A farm universe, with a communist like culture and fear based leadership. They were among the first levels to discover the nature of the universe and attempt to reverse engineer the universal source code, which was compiled in their holy text, the Great Farmer's Almanac. The Topekans are a determinist society who live according to the Almanac's prediction. They have taken it upon themselves to find the Programmer, who is described in the Almanac as the one who can pierce the skin between worlds, in order to reach the Infinite Monkey Dimension, repair the multiverse's calendar function, and ensure their place in the Reboot.

They are also heavily imperialistic, subjugating other levels with value-priced food. They are opposed by the Middle Pangaeans.

Infinite Monkey Dimension
As its name implies, the Infinite Monkey Dimension (also known as "Alternate Dimension") houses an infinite number of monkeys. They were employed by God (before his death), and work as editors of other dimensions.   They work partially because they wish to make the other dimensions better places, and partially for the weekly pudding parties on the dimension. Important Infinite Monkeys in this realm include Steve and Gus, who may or may not have created Oliver as an attempt to make the "story" of the dimension more interesting. Also residing in the Dimension is Woody Allen, the Editor-In-Chief.

The dimension is geographically similar to Arkansas (as seen in numerous strip backgrounds). It has rolling hills and mountains in the distance and a very heavy wooded aspect interlaced with streams and waterfalls. At least four planetary bodies are visible in the skies.

The Infinite Monkey Dimension differs from the other levels in that there is no axis pub, eliminating the prospect of travel to and from the dimension via Knack.

Middle Pangaea
Angry and Downer loners inhabit this realm only to unite in need of reproduction or of tasks that take more than one Middle Pangean. They used to be a happy bunch until a universe was destroyed by Topeka Prime and the worms that fed on happiness invaded their realm. Only the depressed and loneliest survived leading to today's angry militant culture.

Xibalba
Xibalba is the source of the Demon Fire used to complete Oliver's dimension-jumping spider robot, Tarfon. It was first referenced by Stan, who gave the direction as being "one exit south of here on the New Jersey Turnpike." The route is separated by three trials until the traveller must vanquish the gods of death.

Skullburger is also located here and is frequented by familiar characters Ernesto's clone and One Death.

Crab City
Crab City is a City made by Crabs, for Crabs and from Crabs. The Crabs are very proud of this.

Characters

Main characters

 Jon
 Technically the level-headed one, Jon is possessed of a wry sense of humor and seemingly limitless patience. In the beginning, many of the strips relied on mocking his pathetic life, but eventually he got the girl and became a respectable character. He always wears a thin black tie and drinks IPAs. You could sort of call him the main character, but the strip has effortlessly managed to ignore him for months at a time. Recently, he has usurped control of Xibalba Consulting.

 Phillip
 Jon's drinking buddy, a programmer, Swedish, and very fond of Hefeweizen. Phillip views the world through the bottom of a glass that is permanently full of beer, and seems to be completely incapable of pursuing a logical train of thought, or even a coherent one. Nevertheless, this approach seems to pay off, as Phillip is a multi-millionaire, having invented "Sporkle" brand pork and apple drink, and the colour Blern. He has also successfully overclocked a lemon, enjoys the life of a petty supervillain in the guise of the Chaos Pope, and is a member of the International League of Pedants. Phillip is known as "The Programmer" in many prophecies, and he is to save the universe from ending on December 12, 2012.

 Toothgnip
 The Goat of the title, although actually something of a minor player of late. Was one of Thor's chariot-pulling goats, and his name was created during a drunken conversation about Norse mythology. Until recently, he possessed the Panties of Potency, which gave him the power to pick up women in bars. He currently appears to have some other powers, granted by the Demon Fire of Xibalba, but the extent of these is still unclear, suffice to say they include advanced telepathic powers.

 Diablo
 Originally, a satanic chicken, introduced long ago to spice up the comic. Generally causes outrageous violence and mischief, but is still cute. Has been decapitated and dismembered a number of times (and, on one occasion, actually buried). Longtime poker buddies with Stan, whom he mistakenly calls Satan, who makes convincingly good hummus dip.

 Fish/Fineas
 Once a simple goldfish who lived in a mug of beer, "Fish" has evolved dramatically during the series. His other personality, Fineas, is a hyperintelligent immortal cyborg assassin created when Gregor Mendel kidnapped Fish and implanted a USB 1.1 port on the back of his neck, connecting directly to his brain. The Fineas personality emerged on and off, eventually being subjugated into Fish's Twin Peaks-style inner mind. Recently, the internal personification of Fineas was able to use the GNUniverse 1.3 to export himself to the same level as the other characters.

 Neil and Bob
 Two immature, irresponsible, violent, lovable, and self-described omnisexual aliens. They have a spaceship which is powered by an engine which when you put kittens in pop-tarts come out. For some time, the kittens were thought to become poptarts, but in fact are placed in good homes. The poptarts are just a delicious byproduct.

 Oliver
 Diablo's son. Evil genius. Possibly created by Gus and Steve. Wants to take over the world. Currently "driving" the corpse of Khan, Jr.

Plot/Storyline

Early Goats
In the beginning, Jon and Phillip were geeks and they watched TV a lot. That is, when they weren't at the Peculier Pub, consuming great quantities of beer.

Jon was particularly unsuccessful with women, suffered from amazingly low self-esteem and had little in the way of spine, job or coolness. He had a huge crush on a somewhat sadistic bartender at the Peculier known as Lori. Phillip was tall, Swedish and drunk. They hung out a lot with a talking goat named Toothgnip who had a way with the Ladies (later revealed to be due to his Panties of Potency).

Not long into these adventures, along came a talking Satanic chicken named Diablo. Diablo and Toothgnip most certainly did not get along. For one reason or another Diablo's head kept getting blown off, severed, and variously removed from his edifice (only to be replaced later).

At some stage Phillip managed to corrupt two members of an extraterrestrial species. And so Neil and Bob (pun intended) became new and omnisexual members of the cast.

Shazam Twix

The Shazam Twix storyline is told by Diablo in a series of flashbacks. Many parts of the story are clearly meant to be fiction within the goats continuity, although Gregor Mendel, who is introduced in these storylines, has made appearances in the primary storyline.

Post "Soft Reset" Goats
There were 26 series (plus 2 guest artist series) after the destruction of Earth that gradually prepared the characters and readers for large changes that were happening in the comic.

Character development
Diablo has grown away from his overtly evil ways and has become a softer, often more gullible father-figure. Oliver, however, absorbed that lost maliciousness and has shown with a fiery brilliance, a well of evil within himself that dwarfs many of the "bad" things that Diablo had ever done.

Phillip and Jon remained generally the same with small tweaks in their personalities but nothing changing drastically. Fish, though, has very much been the largest change in the new strips leading into more current storylines. His alter-ego, Fineas, has taken more controls over Fish and the lovable character has become harder and more dangerous as a counter to Toothgnip and Oliver's mistreatment of the naive beer-dweller.

Toothgnip has, like the majority of the comic, been often off camera. His few appearances set up the basis for much of the infinite typewriter series and beyond, showing his character in a more bitter and antagonistic vein than he had appeared before.

Minor characters remained as they often had been before: supportive of major character's whims and fleetingly expendable in many cases.

Plot summary
The plot after the destruction of Earth became more storyline based. Instead of many, disjointed topics that left very little permanent change to the Goats multiverse, the topics began to build off each other. The problems between Fish/Fineas and Toothgnip escalated during the Space Wizard series. Diablo and Toothgnip's relationship remained strained but also grew to include Oliver. Oliver and Fineas had a limited respect for each other and began to cooperate against their common enemy.

This transitional phase was primarily a way for Rosenberg to move the Goats strip away from brief one-liners into a more mature, storyline based strip. He has stated on several occasions that he is finally moving the comic in the direction that had always been at least a primary idea for his creation.

Business model
Goats has thrived mostly on revenue from advertising and merchandise, especially t-shirts.

As a pioneer in the web-comics industry, Rosenberg once experimented with micropayments, and the experience convinced him that a business model based on them as a primary source of income would not work for Goats.

Previously, "Premium" and "Super-Premium" services could be purchased which allowed access to extra content (including another Rosenberg comic, "Patent Pending", and a collection of bonus strips) for one year. These services have been discontinued indefinitely, although all the content is still on the site for previous customers. Those who would very much like to catch up on that content now seem to be out of luck.

Reception
Whitney Reynolds, producer of PC Magazine, pointed out that, though Goats started out as a "poorly drawn" strip, the comic has morphed into a "sci-fi epic spanning dimensions."

Books
Early comics were collected in paperbacks. As of November 2013, the following are available:
 – April 1, 1997 through February 1, 1999
 – February 2, 1999 through January 4, 2000
 – January 5, 2000 through January 1, 2001

All of the above are available in e-book format, in addition to:

Random House published three volumes through their Del Rey imprint:

Finally one book was funded after a successful Kickstarter campaign but is unavailable:

See also
Hefeweizen
Dumbrella

References

External links

American webcomics
1990s webcomics
2000s webcomics
Science fiction webcomics
Web Cartoonists' Choice Award winners
1997 webcomic debuts